The Martyrs of Songkhon (also called Seven Blessed Martyrs of Songkhon) are seven Roman Catholic Thais executed in the village Songkhon in Pong Kham subdistrict, Wan Yai District, Mukdahan Province, northeastern Thailand, in December 1940 by local police forces. The killings occurred during the Franco-Thai War and police falsely believed they were spying for the French. The victims were beatified by Pope John Paul II in Rome on October 22, 1989.

The names of the martyrs are:
 Philip Siphong Onphitak, catechist, 33 years old
 Agnes Phila, 31 years old, belonged to Lovers of the Holy Cross Congregation
 Lucia Khambang, 23 years old, belonged to Lovers of the Holy Cross Congregation
 Agatha Phutta, 59 years old
 Cecilia Butsi, 16 years old
 Bibiana Khampai, 15 years old
 Maria Phon, 14 years old

PRAYER TO THE SEVEN BLESSED MARTYRS OF THAILAND

O Merciful Lord, The Seven Blessed Martyrs of Thailand

had witnessed their Christian faith through sacrificing

even their own lives to prove their absolute loyalty to

Christ and his Holy Church.

Let their bright examples encourage all of us to live up

worthily to the same faith in our daily life we humbly

ask this through Christ, Our Lord, Amen.

Our Father... Hail Mary... Glory be...

Blessed Philip Siphong Onphitak, Pray for us!

Blessed Sister Agnes Phila,  Pray for us!

Blessed Sister Lucia Khambang,  Pray for us!

Blessed Agatha Phutta,  Pray for us!

Blessed Cecilia Butsi,  Pray for us!

Blessed Bibiana Khampai,  Pray for us!

Blessed Maria Phon,  Pray for us!

Letter of Sister Agnes Phila to the police before the execution 
To the Chief Police in Songkhon

Yesterday evening you received your order to wipe out, definitely, the Name of God, the Only Lord of our lives and minds. We adore Him only, Sir. A few days earlier, you had mentioned to us that you would not wipe out the Name of God and we were rather pleased with that in such a way that we put away our religious habits which showed that we were His handmaids. But it not so today. We do profess that the religion of Christ is the only true religion. Therefore, we would like to give our answer to your question, asked yesterday evening which we did not have a chance to respond because we were unprepared for it. Now we would like to give you our answer. We are asking you to carry out your order with us. Please do not delay any longer. Please carry out your order. Please open the door of heaven to us so that we can confirm that outside the Religion of Christ no none can go to heaven. Please do it. We are well prepared. When we will be gone we will remember you. Please take pity on our souls. We will be thankful to you and will be grateful to you for it. And on the last day we will see each other face to face.

Do wait and see, please. We keep your commands, oh God, we wish to be witnesses to You, dear God. We are: Agnes, Lucia, Phuttha, Budsi, Buakhai, Suwan. We would like to bring little Phuma along with us because we love her so much. We have already made up our minds, dear Sir.

References

External links
AGNES PHILA AND 5 COMPANION MARTYRS OF SONGKHON ALONG WITH PHILIP SIPHONG ONPHITAK

1940 deaths
People shot dead by law enforcement officers in Thailand
20th-century Roman Catholic martyrs
20th-century venerated Christians
Thai beatified people
Beatifications by Pope John Paul II
People from Mukdahan province